This is a list of Estonian television related events from 2007.

Events
3 February - Gerli Padar is selected to represent Estonia at the 2007 Eurovision Song Contest with her song "Partners in Crime". She is selected to be the thirteenth Estonian Eurovision entry during Eurolaul held at the ETV Studios in Tallinn.
11 March - The Estonian version of Pop Idol debuts on TV3.
14 June - Birgit Õigemeel wins the first season of Eesti otsib superstaari.

Debuts
11 March - Eesti otsib superstaari (2007–present)

Television shows

1990s
Õnne 13 (1993–present)

Ending this year

Births

Deaths
5 May - Dan Põldroos (born 1970), actor 
20 September – Kaljo Kiisk (born 1925), actor, director